Yehuda Pen, also known as Yuri Pen ( – Yudl Pen; 5 June 1854 – 1 March 1937), was a Russian and Soviet Jewish painter and art teacher. He was a major figure of the Jewish Renaissance in Russian and Belarusian art at the beginning of 20th century. Pen's most famous student in Vitebsk was the great Jewish painter Marc Chagall.

Biography
Yehuda Pen was born on May 24 (June 5 Old Style) 1854 in the city of Novoalexandrovsk, known as Ezhereni in Yiddish. He was orphaned at the age of thirteen and became an apprentice to a decorative painter in Dvinsk. In 1879 he went to Saint Petersburg and took the entrance exam at the Imperial Academy of Fine Arts, but failed due to his lack of fluency in Russian. Despite lacking the necessary internal passport, he remained there and, in 1881, obtained permission to audit classes. His teachers included Pavel Chistyakov, Valentin Serov and Mikhail Vrubel. He was eventually admitted as a student and graduated in 1886.

He returned to Dvinsk for a time, then moved to Riga, where he became involved in the local artistic circles and met Ilya Repin, who had an estate along the Dvina that was a meeting place for the Peredvizhniki. In 1891, on his friends' advice, he settled in Vitebsk and, a year later, opened a private art school that was the first Jewish art school in Belarus. He catered to many poor students who were unable to gain admission to the larger academies; all they needed was a sponsor. Pen's pupils included Ilya Mazel, Yefim Minin, Oskar Meshchaninov, Marc Chagall, Ossip Zadkine, Peter Yavich, Leon Gaspard, El Lissitzky, and Isaac Lichtenstein. The school was in operation until 1919. At that time, thanks to the efforts of Chagall, he became a teacher at the Vitebsk Art School. 

Pen was killed at his home in Vitebsk on the night of 28 February/1 March 1937. The exact  circumstances of his death have never been clarified. He was buried in the Jewish cemetery there. The bronze bust on his grave has been stolen twice.

The vast majority of Pen's major works are located in Belarusian museums, a gallery devoted to his works has been created in Vitebsk. His works are also kept at the Vitebsk Museum of Modern Art and the Belarusian National Arts Museum.

Gallery

References
 Шишанов В. А. Витебский Музей современного искусства: история создания и коллекции. 1918—1941. Минск: Медисонт, 2007. 
 Шишанов В. В неразобранном виде... // Витебский проспект. 2006. №2. 12 янв. p. 3.  
 Шишанов В. Материалы о Ю.М.Пэне в РГАЛИ // Бюллетень Музея Марка Шагала. 2004. №2(12). pp. 5–11. 
 Шишанов В. Об утраченном портрете Марка Шагала работы Юрия Пэна // Бюллетень Музея Марка Шагала. 2006. №14. pp. 110–111.
 Шишанов, В. Материалы о Ю. М. Пэне в РГАЛИ / В. Шишанов. // Малевич. Классический авангард. Витебск — 11: [альманах / ред. Т. Котович]. — Минск: Экономпресс, 2009. — pp. 42–55. 
 Изобразительное искусство Витебска 1918 – 1923 гг. в местной периодической печати : библиограф. указ. и тексты публ. / сост. В. А. Шишанов. – Минск : Медисонт, 2010. 
 Мясоедова, С. Школа Юрия Пэна: дата открытия и адреса/ С. Мясоедова, В. Шишанов // Віцебскі край: матэрыялы VІ Міжнароднай навукова-практычнай канферэнцыі «Віцебскі край», прысвечанай 75-годдзю Перамогі ў Вялікай Айчыннай вайне, 19 лістапада 2020 г., Віцебск. – Мінск : Нацыянальная бібліятэка Беларусі, 2021. – Т. 6. – С. 326–333, 430–431.

External links

 Bio at Vitebsk City informational portal
 Vitebsk Museum of Modern Art

Belarusian painters
Jewish painters
Russian artists
Lithuanian Jews
Belarusian Jews
1854 births
1937 deaths
People from Zarasai